Metropolitan State University of Denver (MSU Denver or Metro State) is a public university in Denver, Colorado. MSU Denver is located on the Auraria Campus, along with the University of Colorado Denver and the Community College of Denver, in downtown Denver, adjacent to Speer Boulevard and Colfax Avenue. MSU Denver had an enrollment of 20,192 students in the Fall of 2018.

History and geography 

The institution is located in one of the oldest areas of Denver. The campus is located at the former townsite of Auraria, which was founded in November 1858. Denver was founded three weeks later on the opposing side (east side) of Cherry Creek. Denver would soon overtake Auraria after thriving for a mere two years. For a century following, an Auraria neighborhood would remain. The boundaries of the former neighborhood were Colfax Avenue on the south, the South Platte River on the northwest and Cherry Creek on the northeast. The Auraria Campus, Ball Arena, and Elitch Gardens now inhabit this area.

Auraria had a mix of residential areas and industrial areas through the early to mid-20th century. When the campus was built, many Aurarians, a majority of them Hispanic, were displaced and the school promised to serve the community. The historic Tivoli Brewery was a popular beer brewery on this site that was preserved and the building now serves as the Tivoli Student Union to all three schools on the campus; among other things it is noted for being the site of a stage of the now-defunct Coors Classic world-class bicycle race. Many original buildings remain on campus including a preserved street of Victorian cottages in the 9th Street Historic District. Two churches are still on the campus, St. Elizabeth's of Hungary and St. Cajetan's. The Emmanuel Gallery, which is the oldest synagogue structure in Denver, is on the campus as well and serves as a museum.
Metropolitan State University of Denver was founded in 1965 as an opportunity school. The concept was that people from all walks of life could have a chance at a college education. By design, MSU Denver is required to be accessible to all, which is why it consistently has some of the lowest tuitions of four-year Colorado colleges and universities. Almost half of the student body are students of color.

The Auraria Campus is between Empower Field at Mile High and Ball Arena. During the 2008 Democratic National Convention, MSU Denver started the semester a week early, closed for the convention, and then restarted on schedule. The campus was within the security perimeter designated by the United States Secret Service, leading to the decision to close the campus to all except essential personnel.

MSU Denver was the first university to allow DREAMers to have a chance at higher education. It made national headlines.

Name change controversy
The then-Metropolitan State College of Denver Board of Trustees on March 9, 2011, approved a legislative proposal to change the institution's name to "Denver State University" following a vote among students and faculty.

University of Denver administration and faculty publicly objected to "Denver State University" as MSU Denver's new name. As a result of this, the Board of Trustees decided to cancel the planned name change. Some community members objected and viewed this change of plans as allowing a private university (University of Denver) to decide the fate of a public one (MSU Denver).

On July 1, 2012, the name officially became Metropolitan State University of Denver. To coincide with the new transition from college to university status, the Student Success Building opened its doors and now houses administrative offices, including admissions and financial aid, as well as state-of-the-art classrooms.

Different names
 1965–1990: Metropolitan State College
 1990–2012: Metropolitan State College of Denver
 2012–present: Metropolitan State University of Denver

Campus

The Auraria Campus is the main campus of MSU Denver and is located to the southwest of downtown Denver in the Auraria Neighborhood, enclosed by Auraria Pkwy to the west and north, Speer Blvd to east, and Colfax Ave to the south. MSU Denver shares the campus with two other higher education institutions, the University of Colorado Denver and Community College of Denver. The traditional main entrance to campus is Speer & Lawrence between the North and Science buildings. However, in recent years due to the addition of the RTD Light Rail, many students regard the Colfax At Auraria station at 10th St & Colfax to be the main entrance.

The campus is located in the heart of the central business district and is in close proximity to the Pepsi Center, Elitch Gardens, The Colorado Convention Center, The Denver Performing Arts Complex, Larimer Square, and the 16th Street Mall. The reclaimed Callie Maher brewery, which closed in 1969, now operates as a student union serving all 3 schools on campus.

There are ongoing building renovations on campus, including the library, as well as a new aerospace building next to the Student Success building.

Light Rail
 Auraria West Campus (RTD) – Light rail station for the C, E, & W lines
 Colfax at Auraria (RTD) – Light rail station for the D, F & H lines

Bus
 The Auraria Campus is on eleven RTD bus routes.
Bike
 The Auraria Campus can be reached from both the South Platte River and Cherry Creek bike paths, and is only blocks from Confluence Park, where these two paths intersect.

Buildings
Classroom buildings
 Science Building (Biology, Chemistry, Computer Science, Earth and Atmospheric Sciences, and Mathematics departments; Colorado Alliance for Science)
 Central Classroom Building (Social Work, Anthropology, Communication Arts, Sociology, Philosophy, Journalism, History, International Studies departments; Center for Faculty Development)
 Plaza (Civil Engineering, Electrical Engineering, Mechanical Engineering, Hospitality, Modern Languages, Psychology departments; Health care center; Center for High Risk Youth Studies)
 Kenneth King Center (English, Native American Studies, Philosophy, Political Science, Music, Theater departments; Golda Meir Center; Writing Center)
 West Classroom Building (Criminal Justice, Gerontology, Healthcare Management, Health Education, Human Services, Nursing, Teacher Education departments; Center For Addiction Studies)
 Administration Building (Accounting, Business, Computer Information Science, Economics, Finance, Information Technology, Management, Marketing departments; campus police)
 North Classroom Building (Physics and Mathematics departments)
 South Classroom Building (Engineering departments)
 Boulder Creek Building (Nursing; Engineering & Engineering Technology departments)
 Hotel and Hospitality Learning Center (School of Hospitality)
 Arts Building (Fine Arts, Music, Theater departments)
 Seventh Street Building (Aviation/Aerospace department)
 Aerospace and Engineering Sciences Building (Engineering & Engineering Technology (civil, Electrical and mechanical engineering technology); Industrial design; Computer science; the Advanced Manufacturing Sciences Institute)

Campus resource buildings
 Jordan Student Success Building (Academic Advising, Admissions, Bursar, Cashier, Center For Innovation, Financial Aid, Registrar, Student Academic Success Center, Student Intervention Services, Tutoring Center)
 Tivoli Student Union (Alcohol Beverage Analysis and Beer Production Lab, Bookstore, Career Services, Counseling Center, Foodcourt, LGBT Services, Multicultural Lounge, Phoenix Center, Theaters, Tivoli Turnhalle, Sigi's Caberet) 
 Auraria Library
 St. Francis Center
 Auraria Events Center
 St. Cajetan's Church
 St. Elizabeth's Church and Bonfils Memorial
 Auraria Early Learning Center

Student housing
 Campus Village Dorms
 Auraria Student Lofts (located off-campus at 14th & Curtis)
 The Inn at Auraria (located off-campus at 14th & Arapahoe)
 The Regency (located off-campus at I-25 & Elati)

Extended campus
 MSU Denver South Campus
 Greenwood Village – Denver Technological Center at I-25 and Orchard Road

Organization and administration

President
Janine Anne Davidson, Ph.D. became president of MSU Denver on July 24, 2017.

Provost
Alfred W. Tatum, Ph.D. became provost of MSU Denver on March 16, 2021.

Board of Trustees
On June 7, 2002, Gov. Bill Owens signed House Bill 1165 – Concerning the Establishment of an Independent Governing Board for Metropolitan State College of Denver – and named his appointees to MSU Denver's board of trustees.

Student government
MSU Denver's student government operates under the name "Student Government Assembly" (more commonly referred to as "SGA"), and it is composed of legislative. executive, and electoral branches.  The legislative branch is the Student Senate, which is composed of up to eight senators popularly elected each spring semester to serve one-year terms of office that begin on June 1.  Senate leadership includes the Speaker, the Speaker pro-tempore, and the Parliamentarian.  The Senate is the policy-making body of the SGA. The current SGA Constitution was placed into effect on November 3, 2017.

Schools and centers
MSU Denver contains three colleges and two schools.
 College of Business
 College of Health and Applied Sciences
 College Letters, Arts and Sciences
 School of Education
School of Hospitality

Metropolitan State University of Denver is also home to a variety of projects, research centers, and institutes.

Accreditation
MSU Denver is regionally accredited by the Higher Learning Commission (HLC).

The Department of Art is accredited by the National Association of Schools of Art and Design (NASAD).

The College of Business is accredited by the Association to Advance Collegiate Schools of Business (AACSB).

MSU Denver is accredited by the American Association of State Colleges and Universities (AASCU) and the North Central Association of Colleges and Schools (NCA).

The Bachelor of Science in Computer Science degree program is accredited by ABET, the Accreditation Board for Engineering and Technology.

The Bachelor of Science in Computer Information Systems degree program is accredited by ABET, the Accreditation Board for Engineering and Technology.

Student life

Greek life
The institution has various fraternity and sorority chapters, including

Student media
The Office of Student Media supports four student media productions:
 The Metropolitan (newspaper)
 Met Radio – MET
 Met TV
 Metrosphere

Additional Media
Metro Post-Telegraph

Honor societies

Beta Gamma Sigma
Delta Gamma Xi
Iota Iota Iota
Kappa Delta Pi
Lambda Pi Eta
National Society of Collegiate Scholars
Phi Alpha
Phi Alpha Theta
Psi Chi
Sigma Alpha Pi
Sigma Tau Delta
SALUTE National Veterans

Athletics

MSU Denver has produced 239 All-Americans and was one of the seven charter members of the Colorado Athletic Conference in 1989 before joining the Rocky Mountain Athletic Conference in 1996. MSU Denver competed as a NAIA member until 1983, when the Roadrunners jumped to the NCAA Division II ranks. Since 1998, MSU Denver has captured 32 regular season conference titles, 35 conference tournament championships, as well as the 2000 & 2002 NCAA Division II Men's Basketball National Championships and the 2004 and 2006 NCAA Division II Women's Soccer national crowns. MSU Denver also boasts six individual national championships. Men's springboard diver Jeffrey Smith became Metro's first national champion winning the Men's NAIA national championship on the three meter spring board in 1984. Men's swimmer Darwin Strickland won national championships in the 50m freestyle and 100m freestyle in 1995, and also won the 100m freestyle in 1996. Anthony Luna won men's track championships in the 800 meters during the indoor and outdoor seasons in 2009. Metro State's main rivals are Colorado School of Mines, Fort Lewis College, and Regis University.
 Basketball/Volleyball – Auraria Events Center
 Baseball/Soccer/Softball/Tennis – Regency Athletic Complex
 RMLC/MLCA Men's Lacrosse - Dick's Sporting Good Park
Camps and clinics
 MSU Denver Soccer Camps

Domestic relationships

 University of Arizona
 Adams State University, Colorado Mesa University, Community College of Aurora, Community College of Denver, Front Range Community College, University of Colorado Denver, Western State College of Colorado, Colorado Heights University†
 Fort Hays State University
 Mount Saint Mary's University†‡
 Ohio State University
 University of Puerto Rico
 University of Wisconsin–Milwaukee‡
 University of Wyoming‡
 
† = private
‡ = London Consortium

International relationships
 China – Open University of China
 Ethiopia – Aksum University (AkU)
 Mexico – University of Guadalajara
 United Kingdom – University of London

Notable alumni
Individuals of note who have attended the institution include:

 Kat Cammack U.S. Congressperson
 David W. Ball Novelist and short-story writer
 David Barlow Australian professional basketball player 
 Richard T. Castro educational and civil-rights activist, honored by the Richard T. Castro Distinguished Visiting Professorship
 Steven Emory Professional soccer player
 Sam Tallent Comedian and Author
 Mark Worthington Australian professional basketball player
 Pam Grier actress
 Candi Kubeck captain of ValuJet Flight 592, which crashed into the Florida Everglades on May 11, 1996
 Tony Laubach Meteorologist and storm chaser featured on the Discovery Channel
 Joe Rice former legislator in the State of Colorado, former Mayor of Glendale, and Iraq War veteran
 Laura J. RichardsonUS Lieutenant-General
 Hayden Smith – New York Jets tight end, played basketball at Metro State
 Todd Schmitz American swimming coach
 Gary Striewski NESN Feature Reporter/Anchor/Host
 Gloria Tanner – first African American woman Colorado state senator
 Benjamin Ortner former Austrian professional basketball player

See also
 List of colleges and universities in Colorado

References

External links
 
 Official Athletics Website

 
.
Universities and colleges in Denver
Public universities and colleges in Colorado
Educational institutions established in 1965
1965 establishments in Colorado